Villers-Bretonneux is a railway station located in the commune of Villers-Bretonneux in the Somme department, France.  The station is served by TER Hauts-de-France trains (Amiens - Laon).

The station is opened from Monday to Friday from 5:45 to 9 am and from 12:30 to 1:30 pm. Services are provided by Taxi TER with Blangy-Glisy.

See also
List of SNCF stations in Hauts-de-France

References

Railway stations in Somme (department)
Railway stations in France opened in 1867